Backlash is an umbrella group formed in 2005 to coordinate opposition to the “Consultation on the possession of extreme pornographic material” issued in the United Kingdom jointly by the Home Office and the Scottish Executive. Its stated belief is that the proposals underlying the consultation represent an unjustified assault on freedom of speech and freedom of expression.

"See no evil" was a forum and wiki provided by Backlash as an independent platform for the discussion of the proposed UK law on the possession of "extreme pornography".

The group receives pro bono legal advice from the lawyer Myles Jackman.

Organisations 
Backlash consists of Feminists Against Censorship, Unfettered, Ofwatch, The Spanner Trust, the Libertarian Alliance, the Campaign Against Censorship, the Sexual Freedom Coalition, the Society for Individual Freedom, SM Dykes and the International Union of Sex Workers.

See also
 Consenting Adult Action Network
 Right to pornography
 Spanner case

References

External links 
 Official website
 'Extreme' porn proposals spark row
 Violent porn ban 'a memorial to my daughter'

Civil liberties advocacy groups
Lobbying organisations in the United Kingdom
Political advocacy groups in the United Kingdom
BDSM activists
BDSM organizations
Sex positivism
Sexuality in the United Kingdom
Censorship in the United Kingdom
Organizations established in 2005
2005 establishments in the United Kingdom
United Kingdom pornography law